Dracula psittacina is a species of orchid.

psittacina